The lynching of William Johnson occurred at Thebes, Illinois on April 26, 1903. Johnson had been accused of assaulting a 10-year-old girl. He was apprehended by a mob of farmers and hanged.

History
William Johnson was an African American man who lived in a work camp for erecting the Thebes Bridge in Thebes, Illinois, over the Mississippi River. In late April 1903, Johnson was accused of assaulting the 10-year-old daughter of Branson Davis at his residence a half-mile east of Santa Fe, Illinois (modern day Fayville). A mob of farmers gathered to apprehend Johnson on April 26, but he had already been taken into police custody. The farmers overwhelmed the officers and Johnson was captured. They brought him back to Thebes near the bridge that was being constructed and hanged him from an oak tree. After Johnston expired, the mob shot up the body. The mob then attacked the work camp, exchanging fire and injuring several workers. The farmers then burned the camp and then dispersed. On May 1, the mob raided another work camp on May 1 and dispersed the black workers there. 

Illinois governor Richard Yates offered a $200 bounty for the arrest of those who committed the lynching. Six men were arrested, however, they were released due to insufficient evidence.

See also
Danville race riot
Lynching of David Wyatt

References

1903 in Illinois
1903 murders in the United States
Lynching deaths in Illinois
Alexander County, Illinois
Racially motivated violence against African Americans